Bruno Miguel Nunes Baltazar (born 6 July 1977) is a Portuguese retired footballer who played as a central defender, currently manager of Botev Plovdiv in Parva Liga.

Playing career
Born in Lisbon, Baltazar started his career with local S.U. Sintrense after having already played youth football there. He then switched to Odivelas FC, representing both clubs in the third and fourth divisions and having his first adventure abroad with Dresdner SC in Germany's Regionalliga Nord.

Baltazar started the 2003–04 season still abroad, playing in the English Football Conference with Margate. He returned to his country in the following transfer window, joining C.D. Fátima in the third level, then spent a further campaign in that tier with former side Odivelas.

Baltazar's only experience in the professionals came in 2005–06, as he appeared in only seven Segunda Liga matches for F.C. Barreirense and also suffered relegation. He subsequently returned to the lower leagues, representing Imortal DC, Abrantes F.C. – he split the 2006–07 campaign between the two teams – and Real SC.

After another season abroad, with Digenis Akritas Morphou in the Cypriot Second Division, Baltazar returned to Portugal and joined G.D. Igreja Nova in the third division (team relegation and folding). In January 2010 he rejoined Sintrense in the fourth tier, retiring in June of the following year at the age of 34.

Coaching career
After announcing his retirement, Baltazar took up coaching, starting as assistant manager at his first club Sintrense. In the summer of 2012 he was promoted to head coach, guiding them to promotion to the third division.

In July 2013, Baltazar was appointed at second level side Atlético Clube de Portugal. His stay was however to be short-lived, as he was relieved of his duties after only one month.

Baltazar joined the Philippines national team coaching staff in April 2014, going on to work under Thomas Dooley. He returned to his country shortly after, signing with lowly Casa Pia A.C. as their manager.

In March 2017, after only three months in charge of S.C. Olhanense in the second tier, Baltazar moved to the Cypriot First Division with AEL Limassol. Roughly one year later, in the same capacity, he signed with fellow league club APOEL FC.

Baltazar returned to his country and its second division on 22 January 2019, being appointed at G.D. Estoril Praia. In June, however, he left to become part of the coaching setup at Nottingham Forest following the appointment of Sabri Lamouchi.

On 7 October 2020, Baltazar became the new coach of Al-Ain FC of the Saudi Professional League. Five days later, he announced he could not sign as he was not able to break his contractual relationship with Forest.

Baltazar was appointed head coach of Rochester New York FC on 14 December 2021, ahead of the inaugural MLS Next Pro season.  It was announced on January 3, 2023 that he would be leaving the club after 1 season after agreeing to a fee with Buglarian club Botev Plovdiv.

References

External links

1977 births
Living people
Portuguese footballers
Footballers from Lisbon
Association football defenders
Liga Portugal 2 players
Segunda Divisão players
S.U. Sintrense players
Odivelas F.C. players
C.D. Fátima players
F.C. Barreirense players
Imortal D.C. players
Real S.C. players
Dresdner SC players
National League (English football) players
Margate F.C. players
Cypriot Second Division players
Digenis Akritas Morphou FC players
Portuguese expatriate footballers
Expatriate footballers in Germany
Expatriate footballers in England
Expatriate footballers in Cyprus
Portuguese expatriate sportspeople in Germany
Portuguese expatriate sportspeople in England
Portuguese expatriate sportspeople in Cyprus
Portuguese football managers
Liga Portugal 2 managers
S.U. Sintrense managers
Atlético Clube de Portugal managers
S.C. Olhanense managers
G.D. Estoril Praia managers
Cypriot First Division managers
AEL Limassol managers
APOEL FC managers
Rochester New York FC coaches
Portuguese expatriate football managers
Expatriate football managers in Cyprus
Expatriate soccer managers in the United States
Portuguese expatriate sportspeople in Qatar
Portuguese expatriate sportspeople in the United States
Nottingham Forest F.C. non-playing staff